Chlorurus enneacanthus, known commonly as the captain parrotfish, is a species of marine ray-finned fish, a parrotfish from the family Scaridae. It is widespread throughout the tropical waters of the Indian Ocean region. Its range extends from Mozambique to Christmas Island.

The captain parrotfish is a medium-sized fish and can reach a maximum length of 50 cm.

References

External links
 
http://www.marinespecies.org/aphia.php?p=taxdetails&id=219089
 

enneacanthus
Taxa named by Bernard Germain de Lacépède
Fish described in 1802